Dancehall Queen is a 1997 indie Jamaican film written by Suzanne Fenn, Ed Wallace and Don Letts, starring Audrey Reid, who plays Marcia, a street vendor struggling to raise a bad-tempered daughter, Tanya (Cherine Anderson). Directed by Don Letts and Rick Elgood.

Plot

Marcia Green (Audrey Reid) is a single mom and street vendor barely scraping by even with a financial assist from the seemingly avuncular Larry (Carl Davis), a gun-toting strongman with a twisted desire for Marcia's teenage daughter Tanya (Cherine Anderson) who he then decides to pursue. Complicating things is Priest (Paul Campbell), a murderous hoodlum who killed Marcia's friend and now is terrorizing the defenseless woman. Facing three big problems (Larry, Priest, and without money), Marcia arrives at an inspired solution: develop an alter ego, a dancing celebrity called the Mystery Lady who can compete in a cash-prize contest and put both of the men against one another.

She does so and Marcia very amusingly carries out her complicated plan, with a little help from sympathetic friends.

Cast 
Audrey Reid as Marcia, a struggling street vendor, who decides to use dancing to better her situation. So, she takes on the persona of the Mystery Lady, to raise money.

Cherine Anderson as Tanya, Marcia's older daughter. Trying to live a normal life, she has to deal with the advances of Larry, the wealthy man that her mother seeks money from.

Mark Danvers as Junior, Marcia's younger brother and Tanya's uncle . After witnessing his friend's death, at the hands of Priest, he fears he'll be murdered next.

Carl Davis as Larry, a well-off man, who has an interest in Tanya, he falls for the Mystery Lady.

Paul Campbell as Priest, the knife-wielding hoodlum who's pursuing Marcia

Carl Bradshaw as Police Officer #1

Beenie Man as himself

Lady Saw as herself

Soundtrack
Dancehall Queen mixed recent hits with songs created for the movie, including the title track by Beenie Man.

References

External links
Official Website

1997 films
1997 crime films
Jamaican drama films
Films set in Jamaica
Films directed by Don Letts
1990s English-language films